The Hartford Hawks women's basketball team is the basketball team that represents the University of Hartford in West Hartford, Connecticut, United States. The school's team currently competes as an Independent. The school began the women's basketball team in 1975 as a Division III school. The program moved to Division II and was a member of the Northeast-10 Conference (originally Northeast-7) between 1980 and 1984. The school transitioned to Division I in 1984, playing as an independent school in 1984–85, and then becoming part of the Seaboard Conference in 1985–86. The Seaboard Conference became the North Atlantic Conference in 1989, and changed their name to America East in 1996.

History

2000s
Hartford's most successful run came in the early and mid 2000s under head coach Jen Rizzotti who was hired in 1999. Under Rizzotti, Hartford made 6 NCAA tournament appearances. In 2006 Hartford knocked of the sixth seeded Temple Owls in the first round advancing to the round of the 32 for the first time in program history.  Hartford has continued its success under current head coach Kim McNeill, making the 2018 America East championship game.

Division III

On May 6, 2021, the University of Hartford Board of Regents voted to drop its athletic department to Division III. The drop is set to take place no later than September 1, 2025.

Year by year results
{| class="wikitable"

|- align="center"

|-style="background: #ffffdd;"
| colspan="8" align="center" | Division I

Postseason

NCAA Division I tournament results

WNIT results

Notable players

Danielle Hood, played 2004–2008. Was drafted by the Atlanta Dream as the 32nd pick of the 2008 draft. Although she did not make the final roster, she is the first player from Hartford, and only the second player from an America East Conference team to be drafted by the WNBA.
 Liz Stich, played 2001–2005. Coached Plymouth State University from 2012–2015. She was inducted into the New England Basketball Hall of Fame in 2013.
Erica Beverly, played 2005–2010. She was inducted to the New England Basketball Hall of Fame.

Head coaches
Nancy Lauritis (1975–1976)
Roger Wickman (1976–1984)
Carlos Aldave (1984–1986)
Jean Walling Murphy (1986–1990)
Mark Schmidt (1990–1992)
Allison Jones (1992–1999)
Jennifer Rizzotti (1999–2016)
Kim McNeill (2016–2019)
Morgan Valley (2019–2021)
Melissa Hodgdon (2021–2022)
Polly Thomason (2022–present)

References

External links